Dewanhat Railway Station serves the areas of Dewanhat which lies on  Cooch Behar district in the Indian state of West Bengal. The station lies on Alipurduar–Bamanhat branch line under Alipurduar railway division of Northeast Frontier Railway zone. Local, DEMU trains along with some major trains like Sealdah-Bamanhat Uttar Banga Express, Siliguri Bamanhat Intercity Express are available from this station.

References

Railway stations in West Bengal
Alipurduar railway division